Michael Sani Amanesi, known by his stage name MC Lively (born August 14, 1992) is a Nigerian comedian and actor from Agenebode, Edo State, Nigeria.

Early life and education 
MC Lively was born in Osun State. He attended Ideal Nursery and Primary School and Moremi High School. After secondary school, he attended Obafemi Awolowo University, where he studied law and was called to the Nigerian Bar in 2016, which he had turned down to pursue comedy.

Comedy career and film 
He began his comedy career in 2015, came into the limelight through his funny skits "Agidi" where he talked about events and real life issues happening in Nigeria.

MC Lively has performed alongside other comedians, such as Akpororo, Igosave, among others. He featured in the movie Seven and Half Date (2018). In the movie he played the role of James, Bisola's second date.
He also starred as Dele in the 2020 comedy Fate of Alakada and featured in the 2022 film Survivors.

Awards 
Royal African Youth Leadership award given by the Ooni of IfeCity People Music Award for Comedy Act of the Year

See also
 List of Nigerian comedians

References

External links
 
Handle It Africa 2019
MC Lively The Lawyer-Turned Comedian!

1992 births
Living people
Nigerian male comedians
Obafemi Awolowo University alumni
Male actors from Osun State
Nigerian film actors
21st-century Nigerian lawyers
21st-century Nigerian male actors
Nigerian Internet celebrities